Miss Priyambada was released on 18 August 1967. This is a Bengali movie starring Bhanu Bandyopadhyay, Jahar Roy, Tarun Kumar and Lili Chakraborty.

Plot
Biltu [বিল্টু](Tarun Kumar) is a very honest, sincere, and energetic young man, who stays at a boarding house Pantha Nibas. Biltu loves Doli [ডলি]. Her maternal uncle is the only guardian. A neighbor of Biltu comes to her uncle and informs that Doli and Biltu likes each other. Doli's uncle then decides to arrange her marriage as soon as possible. He contacts his business friend and finalises the groom, who is one of his friend's son. After listening this news, Biltu seeks for help from his friends. One of them eventually enters the house as a nurse (with false name Priyambada, played by Bhanu Bandyopadhyay) to take care of Doli and another friend is appointed as the house guard. Meanwhile, Doli's uncle proposes Miss Priyambada. After have some hilarious incidents, Biltu weds Doli and lives happily together.

Cast
Bhanu Bandyopadhyay
Jahar Roy
Tarun Kumar as Biltu
Lily Chakraborty as Doli
Tapati Ghosh
Nripati Chattopadhyay

Crew
Script, Screenplay, Dialogue: Dushymanta Choudhuri
Director: Rabi Basu, Dushymanta Choudhuri
Producer: United Technologies
Music Director: Subir Sen, Azad Rahman
Lyrics: Shankar Bhattacharya
Voice: Manabendra Mukhopadhyay, Arati Mukhopadhyay, Pratima Mukhopadhyay

Music
"O Shalik Amay De Nare" – Aarti Mukherjee
"Se Ki Tobe Tumi Ogo" – Manabendra Mukherjee, Aarti Mukherjee

See also
 Bhanu Pelo Lottery
 Golpo Holeo Sotyi
 Ora Thake Odhare
 Sare Chuattor

References

1967 films
Bengali-language Indian films
1967 comedy films
1960s Bengali-language films
Films scored by Azad Rahman
Films scored by Subir Sen